The Supercopa Libertadores (English: Libertadores Supercup), also known as the Supercopa Libertadores João Havelange, Supercopa João Havelange or simply Supercopa, was a football club competition contested annually between 1988 and 1997 by the past winners of the Copa Libertadores. The tournament is one of the many South American club competitions that have been organized by CONMEBOL.

History 
As through the successive editions of this cup were added new champions from the Copa Libertadores, in 1997 the CONMEBOL decided that the last teams of each group would descend to reduce the number of teams to disputed it. That year descended Velez Sarsfield, Racing Club and Boca Juniors (all teams from Argentina) and Gremio (Brazil).

The competition was discontinued to make way for the Copa Mercosur and Copa Merconorte in 1998, which also grew in importance after the final season of the Copa CONMEBOL in 1999. These tournaments were also discontinued in favor of the Copa Sudamericana which allowed the revival of the Recopa Sudamericana.

Prior to its abolition, the Supercopa Libertadores was regarded as the second most prestigious South American club competition out of the three major tournaments, behind the Copa Libertadores and ahead of the Copa CONMEBOL. The winner of the tournament played the winner of the Copa Libertadores in the Recopa Sudamericana. Since the abolition of the Supercopa, the Recopa Sudamericana place previously reserved for the Supercopa winner has been taken by the winner of the Copa Sudamericana.

The last champion of the competition was River Plate, while Cruzeiro and Independiente are the most successful clubs in the cup history, having won the tournament two times each. The cup has been won by eight different clubs and won consecutively by Cruzeiro and Independiente.

Format and rules 
The format for the Supercopa Libertadores underwent changes nearly every season. The most common reason behind it was the addition of a new Copa Libertadores winner. The only way to participate in the Supercopa was being a past winner of the Copa Libertadores. Vasco da Gama was later admitted into the competition as winners of the Copa Libertadores' predecessor, the Campeonato Sudamericano de Campeones. The tournament has been predominantly a single-elimination tournament with several stages.

Every round of the competition was contested over a two-legged tie. The teams accumulate points as per the results of the match (3 for a win, 1 for a draw, 0 for a loss). The team with more points after both legs advanced to the next round. Unlike European club competitions, South America did not use extra time to decide a tie that was level on aggregate. Ties in points would be broken first by goal difference, and ultimately by a penalty shootout after the culmination of the second leg.

Participants (1988–1997) 

 Argentinos Juniors
 Boca Juniors
 Estudiantes 
 Independiente
 Racing
 River Plate
 Vélez Sarsfield
 Cruzeiro
 Flamengo
 Grêmio
 Santos
 São Paulo
 Vasco da Gama
 Colo-Colo
 Atlético Nacional
 Olimpia
 Nacional
 Peñarol

List of champions

References

 

Defunct CONMEBOL club competitions
Recurring events disestablished in 1997
Recurring sporting events established in 1988